Flatmates is a British coming of age comedy drama series broadcast on BBC iPlayer and starring Tallulah Greive, Theo Stevenson and Richard Wisker reprising their roles from the CBBC series Millie Inbetween, although the series is intended for a much older audience. All ten episodes of the first series premiered on iPlayer on 5 August 2019. The second series consisted of 8 episodes and all 8 premiered on iPlayer on 1 April 2021. As of September 2022 it is unknown if the show will return for a third series.

Premise
The series follows the lives of five teenagers as they begin their steps into the adult world.

Cast
 Tallulah Greive as Lauren McDonald (series 1)
 Theo Stevenson as Craig Taylor
 Richard Wisker as Declan
 Nethra Tilakumara as Yasmin, a waitress at the café the characters frequent
 Grace Hogg-Robinson as Mel, Craig's co-worker at the bowling alley
 Oliver Clayton as Russ, Lauren's co-worker, and rival
 Jordan Dawes as Craig 2, Craig and Mel's boss
 Hannah Jane Fox as Sharon Taylor, Lauren's mum. Fox reprises her role from Millie Inbetween.
 Jade Ogugua as Alex, Lauren's new boss
 Rebecca Atkinson as Erin (series 2), the landlady who owns the flats
 Theo Graham as Zak (series 2)
 Elèna Gyasi as Tiegan (series 2)
 Connor Calland as Callum (series 2)

Development
Flatmates co-creator Steven Andrews said of the series "Flatmates represents the significant journey we all make from childhood to adulthood. With a balance of drama and comedy, the show taps perfectly into BBC iPlayer's millennial following and has all the elements we hope will make it a bingeable success".

Episodes

Series 1
Adapted from BBC iPlayer and IMDb.

References

External links
 

2019 British television series debuts
2010s British comedy-drama television series
2010s British sitcoms
2020s British comedy-drama television series
2020s British sitcoms
BBC high definition shows
BBC television sitcoms
English-language television shows
Television series by Banijay
Television shows set in Manchester